Mohammadabad (also Romanized as Moḩammadābād; also known as Moḩammadābād-e Dast Goshā) is a village in Shahrabad Rural District, Shahrabad District, Bardaskan County, Razavi Khorasan Province, Iran. At the 2006 census, its population was 885, in 223 families.

References 

Populated places in Bardaskan County